Jack Rutherford (April 12, 1893 – August 21, 1982) was a British film and television actor. Rutherford first appeared in British films in leading or prominent supporting roles during the silent era. He later went to Hollywood where he often played villains in Western films. His most significant American role was as the Sheriff in the 1930 comedy Whoopee! (1930).

Selected filmography

 The Great Shadow (1920) - Bo Sherwood
The Marriage Business (1927) - Duncan
The Streets of London (1929) - Mark Livingstone
Whoopee! (1930) - Sheriff Bob Wells
Half Shot at Sunrise (1930) - MP Sergeant
Mr. Lemon of Orange (1931) - Henchman Castro (uncredited)
The Woman from Monte Carlo (1932) - Verguson
My Pal, the King (1932) - Herald (uncredited)
A Successful Calamity (1932) - Wilton's Chauffeur
Cowboy Counsellor (1932) - Bill Clary
Roman Scandals (1933) - Manius
The Affairs of Cellini (1934) - Captain of the Guards
Cleopatra (1934) - Drussus - Model Builder (uncredited)
The Man Who Reclaimed His Head (1934) - A Soldier (uncredited)
Cardinal Richelieu (1935) - Outrider (uncredited)
Social Error (1935) - Police Desk Sergeant (uncredited)
Justice of the Range (1935) - Lafe Brennan
The Crusades (1935) - Knight (uncredited)
The Oregon Trail (1936) - Benton
Heart of the West (1936) - Tom Paterson
Three on the Trail (1936) - Henchman Lewis
Rootin' Tootin' Rhythm (1937) - Henchman (uncredited)
North of the Rio Grande (1937) - Ace Crowder
Raw Timber (1937) - Supervisor Lane
Hopalong Rides Again (1937) - Blackie
Fit for a King (1937) - Ship's Officer (uncredited)
Ali Baba Goes to Town (1937) - Sentry (uncredited)
The Buccaneer (1938) - Orderly (uncredited)
Gold Is Where You Find It (1938) - Miner (uncredited)
Flaming Frontiers (1938, Serial) - Buffalo Bill Cody / Henchman Rand
Riders of the Frontier (1939) - Bart Lane
Yukon Flight (1940) - James Benton (uncredited)
Florian (1940) - Groom (uncredited)
Arizona Gang Busters (1940) - Thorpe
Trailing Double Trouble (1940) - Amos Hardy
North West Mounted Police (1940) - Corporal (uncredited)
Riders of Black Mountain (1940) - Biff Hunter
Rollin' Home to Texas (1940) - Carter
High Sierra (1941) - Policeman (uncredited)
Corregidor (1943) - General (uncredited)
Utah (1945) - Sheriff McBride
Road to Utopia (1945) - Townsman (uncredited)
Frontier Gal (1945) - Barfly (uncredited)
Untamed Fury (1947) - Nubie Blair
Kiss of Death (1947) - Policeman (uncredited)
Cult of the Cobra (1955) - Policeman (uncredited)

References

Bibliography
Harker, Ina Rae. American Cinema of The 1930s: Themes and Variations. Rutgers University Press, 2007.
Low, Rachel. The History of British Film: Volume IV, 1918–1929. Routledge, 1997.

External links

1893 births
1982 deaths
English male film actors
English male television actors
English male silent film actors
20th-century English male actors
British expatriate male actors in the United States